The Eugene Augur was a local countercultural underground newspaper published in Eugene, Oregon, United States, from 1969 to 1974. Starting with its first issue dated October 14, 1969, the Augur, produced by a cooperative of left-wing political activists aligned with the antiwar movement, appeared twice a month, offering up a mix of New Left politics and acid rock counterculture to an audience of students, hippies, radicals and disaffected working class youth in the Eugene area. The paper's coverage ranged from antiwar demonstrations, exposing local narcotics agents, and rock festivals, to the growth of backwoods communes in Southern Oregon and the annual Oregon Renaissance Faire. In August 1972, the paper cut publication to a monthly schedule. Staffers included Peter Jensen and Jim Redden, son of a prominent Oregon politician and later a reporter for the Portland Tribune.

See also
 List of underground newspapers of the 1960s counterculture

References

Defunct newspapers published in Oregon
Mass media in Eugene, Oregon
Culture of Eugene, Oregon
1969 establishments in Oregon
1974 disestablishments in Oregon